Thoasia rugifrons, the rough-headed pentagonal arboreal carabid, is a species of beetle in the family Carabidae. It is found in Venezuela and in the lowlands of French Guiana.

Description
They are macropterous and capable of flight. Standard body length is 4.11–4.16 mm. Elytra shiny metallic. Forebody and head also shiny. Pronotum moderately narrow. Abdomen Sparsely setiferous.

References

Lebiinae
Beetles described in 1939